Ozar may refer to:
 Ozar, Iran
 Ozar, Madhya Pradesh, in Barwani District of Madhya Pradesh, India 
 Ozar, Nashik District, Maharashtra, India
 Ozar, Pune District famous for its Vigneshwara Temple, Ozar, India

See also
 Ozara (disambiguation)